Icaricia shasta, the Shasta blue, is a butterfly of the family Lycaenidae. It is found from the northwestern United States to southern Saskatchewan and Alberta.

The wingspan is 20–22 mm. Adults are on wing from June to August.

The larvae feed on Lupinus lyalli, Astragalus spatulatus, Astragalus calycosus, and Trifolium dasphyllum.

Subspecies
There are seven subspecies of Icaricia shasta.

I. s. charlestonensis Austin, 1980
I. s. calchas (Behr, 1867)
I. s. minnehaha (Scudder, 1874)
I. s. pallidissima (Austin in T. Emmel, 1998)
I. s. pitkinensis Ferris, 1976
I. s. platazul Scott, 2006
I. s. shasta (W. H. Edwards, 1862)

References

External links
Butterflies and Moths of North America: Shasta blue 

Icaricia
Butterflies of North America
Fauna of California
Fauna of the Sierra Nevada (United States)
Butterflies described in 1862
Taxa named by William Henry Edwards